Solo Kota Station (also known as Sangkrah Station) is a railway station located in Sangkrah, Pasar Kliwon, Surakarta, Central Java, Indonesia. The station has three railway tracks.

Services
The following is a list of train services at the Solo Kota Station

Passenger services
 Commuter
 Tourist train
 Sepur Kluthuk Jaladara, destination of

References

External links
 

Buildings and structures in Surakarta
Railway stations in Central Java
Railway stations opened in 1922